The Economic Freedom Party (EFP) is a political party in Kenya.

History
The EFP was established in March 2017 by politicians from Mandera County including Senator Billow Kerrow and MPs Mohamed Huka and Fathia Mabub after they had left the United Republican Party and the Jubilee Alliance. The party was officially launched in Nairobi in April. In the 2017 general elections the party won five seats in the National Assembly.

References

External links

2017 establishments in Kenya
Political parties established in 2017
Political parties in Kenya